Saint David's Holy Faith Secondary School is a co-educational secondary level school in Greystones, County Wicklow, Ireland. It was originally established in 1906 as an all-girls boarding school by the Holy Faith sisters.

Curricular studies 

Students at Saint David's undertake the Junior Cycle for their first three years at the school, and the Leaving Certificate curriculum for their last two. In between the two courses is an optional extra, Transition Year, affording students the opportunity to study subjects and topics not present on the exam syllabi.

Notable past pupils
Paul McShane, footballer for Reading
Maria Doyle Kennedy, singer, songwriter, and television/film actress
Simon Harris, Fine Gael TD for Wicklow Constituency
Stephen Donnelly, Fianna Fáil TD for Wicklow Constituency

Schools in County Wicklow
1906 establishments in Ireland
Educational institutions established in 1906